Susan "Susie" Paterno is an Australian actress and TV personality. Paterno was a regular cast member of both Eric Bana's comedy sketch show Eric in 1997 and Shaun Micallef'sThe Micallef Programme in 1998. She has had roles on Australian TV dramas Neighbours and Blue Heelers and has starred in such films as Johannes Roberts New Zealand horror movie Darkhunters in 2004 and Round Ireland with a Fridge in 2010. In 2012 Susan was a co-host of the RMITV flagship program Live on Bowen.

Filmography

References

20th-century Australian actresses
21st-century Australian actresses
Australian film actresses
Australian television actresses
Living people
RMITV alumni
Year of birth missing (living people)